Yuexiu Hill, also known as Yut Sau Shan , Yut Sau Hill or Mount Yuexiu, is located in Yuexiu District, Guangzhou. It once formed the northern end of the old walled city, though most of the walls have been dismantled and the city has now expanded far beyond it. Its grounds now form Guangzhou's , which remains one of the most famous tourist attractions in Guangzhou, including beautiful natural surroundings and ancient sites.

Name
Yuexiu is also known as "Mount Yuexiu", "Yuexiu Mountain", and "Yuexiu Shan" from its Mandarin name.

Popular attractions

Five Rams Sculpture

Guangzhou's Five Rams Sculpture is located atop Yuexiu Hill. It was built in 1960 from more than 130 pieces of granite and is one of the city's emblems.

The sculpture represents the five rams who gave Guangzhou its nickname "City of Rams" and were formerly honored at its Temple of the Five Immortals. These immortals were said to have ridden rams into the city soon after its founding, teaching its residents how to grow rice and ending the specter of famine forever. Locals consider the rams symbols of good luck.

Zhenhai Tower/Chen Hoi Lau

Also atop Yuexiu Hill is the Five-storied Pagoda now known as Chen Hoi Lau. It has housed the Guangzhou Museum since it was opened to the public in 1928.

A guard tower was first erected at the site in 1380, one of the first to be constructed in Lingnan. Chinese legend holds that Zhu Liangzu, Marquis of Yongjia and a member of the Ming dynasty, saw yellow and purple air rising over Yuexiu and was told that it was the sign of a new emperor. He then erected the tower as part of the city walls to alter the mountain's feng shui and prevent the prophecy from coming to pass. It has been destroyed and rebuilt five times, the various towers appearing in Chinese poetry and art.

Yuexiu Stadium/Yut Sau Shan Stadium

Yuexiu Stadium was refreshed from the old Yut Sau Shan Park Playground at the foot of the hill in 1950 at the behest of Mayor Ye Jianying. It was one of the Asian Games venues in 2010.

The stadium is not only a sports activity site, but also a large-scale concert hall. Since its opening in October 1950, it has held 200 meetings and more than 280 performances. It can hold 35,000 people.

Pavilion of Regaining
The Pavilion of Regaining is a square pavilion erected in 1948 on the spot of an earlier 1928 memorial to the Xinhai Revolution against the Qing Empire. The first pavilion was destroyed amid fighting with the Japanese during World War II.

References

Hills of China
Landforms of Guangdong
Tourist attractions in Guangzhou
Yuexiu District